Sigrid Close (born 1971) is a professor in the Department of Aeronautics and Astronautics at Stanford University. Her primary research interest is the space environment with particular focus on meteoroids, meteors, and orbital debris, and their interaction with spacecraft and spacecraft operations.

Career

Professor Close's research involves space weather detection and modeling for improved spacecraft designs, and advanced signal processing and electromagnetic wave interactions with plasma for ground-to-satellite communication systems. These topics fall under the Space Situational Awareness (SSA) umbrella that include environmental remote sensing using satellite systems and ground-based radar. Her current efforts are the MEDUSSA (Meteoroid, Energetics, and Debris Understanding for Space Situational Awareness) program, TALIS (Tomographic Array for Lightning and Ionospheric Studies) using ground-based and space-based RF sensors, and using ground-based radar data to characterize the meteoroid population and its threat to spacecraft.  She was a member of two NRC panels, in 2010 examining options for detecting and countering near-Earth objects, and in 2011 assessing NASA's meteoroid and orbital debris programs.

Awards and honors
 In 2010, she won an NSF Career Award and a Hellman Faculty Fellowship award for her meteor research.
 In 2013 she was selected for a DoE Early Career Award for her work on hypervelocity impact plasmas, and also awarded a Presidential Early Career Award for Scientists and Engineers.
 She was the inaugural Science Guest of Honor at the ArmadilloCon science fiction and fantasy literary convention in 2014.
 In 2017 she was recognized by the American Geophysical Union with the Space Physics and Aeronomy Richard Carrington (SPARC) Education and Public Outreach Award. for significant and outstanding impact on students' and the public's understanding of geophysical science through education and outreach activities.
 Asteroid 11009 Sigridclose, discovered by astronomer Schelte Bus at the Siding Spring Observatory in 1981, was named in her honor. The official  was published by the Minor Planet Center on 13 April 2017.
 In 2018 she was selected as a NIAC fellow for her research titled "Meteoroid Impact Detection for Exploration of Asteroids (MIDEA)", and in 2021 she was selected as a NIAC fellow for her research titled "Exploring Uranus through Sustained CubeSat Activity Through Transmitted Electromagnetic Radiation (SCATTER)".

Television
In 2011, Professor Close co-hosted season three of National Geographic Channel's Known Universe documentary series along with David E. Kaplan, Andy Howell, Michael J. Massimino, and Steve Jacobs.  She was interviewed on the Nova ScienceNow Can We Make It to Mars? episode in 2011 and the Nova Chasing Pluto special in 2015.

References

External links
 
 Stanford School of Engineering Faculty Profile
 Space Environment and Satellite Systems Laboratory
 Stanford scientist closes in on a mystery that impedes space exploration

Living people
1971 births
Northern Lehigh High School alumni
Stanford University Department of Aeronautics and Astronautics faculty
Recipients of the Presidential Early Career Award for Scientists and Engineers